Thomas, Tom, or Tommy Walsh may refer to:

Sportspeople

Association football (soccer) 
 Tot Walsh (Thomas Walsh, 1900–1950), English association footballer for Bolton, Bristol City and Crystal Palace
 Tom Walsh (footballer) (born 1996), Scottish association footballer

Gaelic football 
 Tommy Walsh (Kerry footballer) (born 1988), Kerry Gaelic footballer and Australian rules footballer
 Tommy Walsh (Wicklow Gaelic footballer), Wicklow Gaelic footballer

Hurling 
 Tom Walsh (Dunnamaggin hurler), former Kilkenny hurler
 Tom Walsh (Thomastown hurler) (born 1944), former Kilkenny hurler
 Tommy Walsh (hurler, born 1983), Irish hurler for Kilkenny and Tullaroan
 Tommy Walsh (hurler, born 1998), Irish hurler for Kilkenny and Tullaroan

Rugby 
 Tom Walsh (rugby league), rugby league footballer of the 1900s and 1910s for Hunslet
 Tom Walsh (rugby league, Castleford), rugby league footballer of the 1930s, 1940s and 1950s for Castleford

Others 
 Tom Walsh (American football) (born 1949), former Oakland/Los Angeles Raiders offensive coordinator and college head coach
 Thomas Walsh (skier) (born 1995), American para-alpine skier
 Tom Walsh (baseball) (1886–1963), American baseball player
 Tom Walsh (shot putter) (born 1992), New Zealand shot putter
 Tom Walsh (squash player) (born 1999), English professional squash player

Politicians
 Thomas Walsh (Irish politician) (1901–1956), Fianna Fáil politician and Minister for Agriculture
 Thomas Walsh (Massachusetts politician) (born 1960), Massachusetts politician
 Thomas Walsh (MP for Leicestershire), English politician
 Thomas J. Walsh (1859–1933), American lawyer and US Senator from Montana
 Thomas J. Walsh (Alberta politician) (1875–1945), Canadian politician
 Thomas J. Walsh (New York politician) (c. 1892–1955), New York state senator and Staten Island judge
 Thomas P. Walsh (born 1939), Pennsylvania politician
 Thomas Yates Walsh (1809–1865), U.S. Representative from Maryland

Religious figures
 Thomas Walsh (archbishop of Cashel) (died 1654), Irish Roman Catholic prelate
 Thomas Walsh (archbishop of Newark) (1873–1952), American Roman Catholic prelate
 Thomas Walsh (vicar apostolic) (1776–1849), English Roman Catholic bishop and vicar apostolic
 Thomas E. Walsh (1853–1893), Irish-Canadian Catholic priest and president of the University of Notre Dame

Others
 Thomas Walsh (Colorado architect), architect in Denver, Colorado
 Thomas Walsh (miner) (1850–1910, Thomas Francis Walsh), Irish-American miner and multi-millionaire, of Colorado
 Thomas Walsh (mobster) (died 1929), New York mobster involved
 Thomas Walsh (poet) (1875–1928), American poet and literary figure
 Thomas Walsh (trade unionist) (1891–1964), British trade unionist
 Thomas J. Walsh (Alberta lawyer) (1927–2016), lawyer from Calgary, Alberta
 Thomas Joseph Walsh (Wexford) (1911–1989), founder of the Wexford Opera Festival
 Thomas Stephen Walsh (1925–2003), Garda Inspector
 Thomas Waryng Walsh (1826–1890), St. Louis architect
 Thomas Walsh, frontman with Irish band Pugwash
 Tom Walsh (trade unionist) (1871–1943), Irish-born Australian trade unionist
 Tommy Walsh (builder) (born 1956), English celebrity builder

See also
Thomas Welch (disambiguation)
Thomas Welsh (disambiguation)